Shigang District is a rural district in Taichung City, Taiwan.

Geography 
It has a population total of 14,131 and an area of 18.2105 square kilometres.

Administrative divisions 
Shigang, Wanan, Jiufang, Jinxing, Longxing, Wanxing, Meizi, Tuniu, Dexing and Hecheng Village.

Tourist attractions 
 Shigang Dam
 Tuniu Hakka Cultural Museum

See also 
 Taichung

References 

Districts of Taichung